North Mill is the name of a number of mills.

Windmills

North Mill, Barney, a windmill in Norfolk
North Mill, Brancaster, a windmill in Noroflk
North Mill, Burnham on Crouch, a windmill in Essex
North Mill, Caister, a windmill in Norfolk
North Mill, Clavering, a windmill in Essex
North Mill, Cottingham,  a windmill in the East Riding of Yorkshire
North Mill, Devizes Castle, Devizes, a windmill in Wiltshire
North Mill, Halstead, a windmill in Essex
North Mill, Ludham Bridge, a drainage mill in Norfolk
North Mill, Middleton, a windmill in Norfolk
North Mill, Pulham St Mary, a windmill in Norfolk
North Mill, Radwinter, a windmill in Essex
North Mill, Reedham, a drainage mill in Norfolk
North Mill, Rickinghall Inferior, a windmill in Suffolk
North Mill, Ringstead, a windmill in Norfolk
North Mill, Runham Swim, a *drainage mill in Norfolk
North Mill, Westfield, a windmill in East Sussex
North Mill, Whissonsett, a windmill in Norfolk
North Mill, Wymondham, a windmill in Noroflk
Navarino North Mill, Worthing, a windmill in West Sussex

Watermills
North Mill, Belper, a cotton mill on the River Derwent, Derbyshire
North Mill, Leeds, a watermill on the River Len, Kent